Coatesville is an affluent, rural community situated approximately 30 km north-west of Auckland, New Zealand. Albany lies to the east, Paremoremo to the south, Riverhead to the south-west, and Dairy Flat to the north.

The area was called Fernielea until 1926, when it was renamed after Gordon Coates, the Prime Minister at the time.

Mincher is a garden of national significance in Coatesville. Other gardens open to the public by appointment include Woodbridge and Twin Lakes.

Demographics

Coatesville had a population of 2,328 at the 2018 New Zealand census, an increase of 105 people (4.7%) since the 2013 census, and an increase of 354 people (17.9%) since the 2006 census. There were 744 households, comprising 1,146 males and 1,182 females, giving a sex ratio of 0.97 males per female. The median age was 42.7 years (compared with 37.4 years nationally), with 441 people (18.9%) aged under 15 years, 444 (19.1%) aged 15 to 29, 1,152 (49.5%) aged 30 to 64, and 291 (12.5%) aged 65 or older.

Ethnicities were 88.8% European/Pākehā, 4.4% Māori, 1.9% Pacific peoples, 10.1% Asian, and 1.2% other ethnicities. People may identify with more than one ethnicity.

The percentage of people born overseas was 32.3, compared with 27.1% nationally.

Although some people chose not to answer the census's question about religious affiliation, 58.2% had no religion, 32.0% were Christian, 0.6% were Hindu, 0.1% were Muslim, 0.4% were Buddhist and 1.7% had other religions.

Of those at least 15 years old, 612 (32.4%) people had a bachelor's or higher degree, and 147 (7.8%) people had no formal qualifications. The median income was $46,000, compared with $31,800 nationally. 618 people (32.8%) earned over $70,000 compared to 17.2% nationally. The employment status of those at least 15 was that 1,002 (53.1%) people were employed full-time, 345 (18.3%) were part-time, and 33 (1.7%) were unemployed.

Education
A new school opened in 1923. The school celebrated 100 years on 16 of October 2016.

Coatesville Playcentre started in Coatesville Hall in the 1970s before moving into a purpose built centre next to the school in the 1980s. Playcentre offers parent-led early childhood education for children aged 0–5 years.

Coatesville Learning Centre opened in 2012 catering for 1- to 5-year-old children.

Notes

Rodney Local Board Area
Populated places in the Auckland Region